Zuyevsky (masculine), Zuyevskaya (feminine), or Zuyevskoye (neuter) is the name of several rural localities in Russia:
Zuyevsky, Novosibirsk Oblast, a settlement in Krasnozyorsky District of Novosibirsk Oblast
Zuyevsky, Perm Krai, a settlement in Oktyabrsky District of Perm Krai
Zuyevskaya, Arkhangelsk Oblast, a village in Tarnyansky Selsoviet of Shenkursky District of Arkhangelsk Oblast
Zuyevskaya, Kirov Oblast, a village under the administrative jurisdiction of Oktyabrsky City District of the city of Kirov, Kirov Oblast
Zuyevskaya, Vologda Oblast, a village in Maryinsky Selsoviet of Vozhegodsky District of Vologda Oblast